In quantum field theory, the operator product expansion (OPE) is used as an axiom to define the product of fields as a sum over the same fields. As an axiom, it offers a non-perturbative approach to quantum field theory. One example is the vertex operator algebra, which has been used to construct two-dimensional conformal field theories. Whether this result can be extended to QFT in general, thus resolving many of the difficulties of a perturbative approach, remains an open research question.

In practical calculations, such as those needed for scattering amplitudes in various collider experiments, the operator product expansion is used in QCD sum rules to combine results from both perturbative and non-perturbative (condensate) calculations.

2D Euclidean quantum field theory 
In 2D Euclidean field theory, the operator product expansion is a Laurent series expansion associated to two operators. A Laurent series is a generalization of the Taylor series in that finitely many powers of the inverse of the expansion variable(s) are added to the Taylor series: pole(s) of finite order(s) are added to the series.

Heuristically, in quantum field theory one is interested in the result of physical observables represented by operators.

If one maps coordinates in a conformal manner, one is often interested in radial ordering.  This is the analogue of time ordering where increasing time has been mapped to some increasing radius on the complex plane.  One is also interested in normal ordering of creation operators.

A radial-ordered OPE can be written as a normal-ordered OPE minus the non-normal-ordered terms.  The non-normal-ordered terms can often be written as a commutator, and these have useful simplifying identities.  The radial ordering supplies the convergence of the expansion.

The result is a convergent expansion of the product of two operators in terms of some terms that have poles in the complex plane (the Laurent terms) and terms that are finite.  This result represents the expansion of two operators at two different points as an expansion around just one point, where the poles represent where the two different points are the same point e.g.

.

One should really call them meromorphic, but holomorphic is common parlance. In general, the operator product expansion may not separate into holomorphic and anti-holomorphic parts, especially if there are  terms in the expansion. However, derivatives of the OPE can often separate the expansion into holomorphic and anti-holomorphic expansions. This expression is also an OPE  and in general is more useful.

Operator product algebra
In the generic case, one is given a set of fields (or operators)  that are assumed to be valued over some algebra. For example, fixing x, the  may be taken to span some Lie algebra.  Setting x free to live on a manifold, the operator product  is then simply some element in the ring of functions. In general, such rings do not possess enough structure to make meaningful statements; thus, one considers additional axioms to strengthen the system. 

The operator product algebra is an associative algebra of the form

The structure constants  are required to be single-valued functions, rather than sections of some vector bundle. Furthermore, the fields are required to span the ring of functions. Thus, the ring of functions can be taken to be the ring of polynomial functions.

The above can be viewed as a requirement that is imposed on a ring of functions; imposing this requirement on the fields of a conformal field theory is known as the conformal bootstrap.

An example of an operator product algebra is the vertex operator algebra.  It is currently hoped that operator product algebras can be used to axiomatize all of quantum field theory; they have successfully done so for the conformal field theories, and whether they can be used as a basis for non-perturbative QFT is an open research area.

Operator product expansion 

In quantum field theory, the operator product expansion (OPE) is a convergent expansion of the product of two fields at different points as a sum (possibly infinite) of local fields.

OPEs are most often used in conformal field theory.

The notation  is often used to denote that the difference G(x,y)-F(x,y) remains analytic at the points x=y. This is an equivalence relation.

See also
 Vertex operator algebra
 QCD sum rules

External links
 The OPE at Scholarpedia

Quantum field theory
Axiomatic quantum field theory
Conformal field theory
String theory